Antiplanes amphitrite is a species of sea snail, a marine gastropod mollusk in the family Pseudomelatomidae,.

These is one subspecies: Antiplanes amphitrite beroë Dall, 1919: it is larger (height 19 mm, diameter 9 mm.), with the suture appressed, the fasciole close to it, and bearing three or four spiral grooves

Description
The length of the shell attains 13.5 mm, its diameter 6 mm.

(Original description) The white shell is covered with a pale olivaceous periostracum. It contains five or more well-rounded whorls exclusive of the (lost) protoconch. These show a rounded shoulder and a distinct but not appressed suture. The axial sculpture consists of, on the spire, obscure nodulations at the shoulder (about 15 on the penultimate whorl) which do not form ribs and are absent from the body whorl.  The incremental lines are fine but obscure. Beside these there are minute, anteriorly obliquely retractive lines somewhat microscopically reticulated by the lines of growth.tTere is no spiral sculpture except on some specimens a few obsolete lines on the base. The anal sulcus is shallow, slightly removed from the suture. The fasciole is lightly impressed on the body whorl. The aperture is narrow. The outer lip is thin, sharp and arcuately produced. The inner lip is erased. The columella is white, solid straight, anteriorly obliquely attenuated. The siphonal canal is wide, straight and distinct

Distribution
The holotype was found off Santa Barbara Island, California, USA.

References

External links
 

amphitrite
Gastropods described in 1919